The Municipal Library of Constantine is a library located in Constantine, Algeria. It holds 25,000 volumes.

References 

Libraries in Algeria
Public libraries in Algeria
State libraries of Algeria
Buildings and structures in Constantine, Algeria